Rudnyansky District is an administrative district (raion), one of the thirty-three in Volgograd Oblast, Russia. As a municipal division, it is incorporated as Rudnyansky Municipal District. It is located in the north of the oblast. Its administrative center is the urban locality (a work settlement) of Rudnya. Population:  19,176 (2002 Census);  The population of Rudnya accounts for 42.4% of the district's total population.

References

Notes

Sources

Districts of Volgograd Oblast